Baba Mahmud may refer to:

Baba Mahmud-e Olya
Baba Mahmud-e Vosta